Bernhard Steffen (born 1 June 1937) is a German former international footballer who played as a forward for Fortuna Düsseldorf.

References

External links
 

1937 births
Living people
German footballers
Germany international footballers
Association football forwards
Fortuna Düsseldorf players
West German footballers
Sportspeople from Krefeld
Footballers from North Rhine-Westphalia